Myeongdong is a dong in Jung-gu, Seoul, South Korea  between Chungmu-ro, Eulji-ro, and Namdaemun-ro. It covers 0.99km² with a population of 3,409 and is mostly a commercial area, being one of Seoul's main shopping, parade route and tourism districts.
In 2011, 2012 and 2013, Myeong-dong was listed as the ninth most expensive shopping street in the world. The area is known for its two historically significant sites, namely the Myeongdong Cathedral and the Myeongdong Nanta Theatre.

History

Myeongdong dates back to the Joseon Dynasty when it was called Myeongryebang and mostly a residential area. During the Japanese era the name was changed to Myeongchijeong (Meijicho in Japanese pronunciation) and became more of a commercial district, being influenced by the rising commerce in the neighboring Chungmuro area. It became the official district of Myeongdong in 1946, after independence.

After the Korean War and into the 1960s, the economy blossomed and the financial sector from Namdaemun-ro and Euljiro gradually expanded into Myeongdong. The area flourished as city renovations took place and highrise buildings were built. Many department stores, shopping centers, restaurants, upscale shops and boutiques set up their businesses in Myeongdong and it became popular with the young and trendy in the 1970s.

Besides being a major commercial and financial district, Myeongdong has been a popular location for political demonstrations and protests, especially during the turbulent years of the 1980s and 1990s. Myeongdong Cathedral has been a frequent spot for many of these demonstrations and still is to this day.

As of March 2000, Myeongdong's has been designated as a special Tourism Promotion Area and is one of the stops on the official Seoul City Bus tour's main route.

Characteristic

Seoul's financial hub is divided between here and Yeouido where the Korea Stock Exchange is located. Major insurance, securities, financial services companies, and investment firms with headquarters in Myeongdong include Citibank, SK Corporation, Kookmin Bank, Korea Exchange Bank, Lone Star Funds, Sumitomo Mitsui Banking Corporation, AIG Korea Insurance, Hana Bank, and HSBC. The Bank of Korea is also in the vicinity.

Other notable landmarks in Myeongdong include the Chinese Embassy, which was first opened on January 4, 1949. YWCA headquarters, UNESCO Hall, Myeongdong Theater, and the oldest Catholic cathedral in Korea, Myeongdong Cathedral.

Except for early morning and late night delivery hours, the main street and most of the alleys are blocked off for pedestrians to roam freely without being hindered by traffic.

Luxury shopping 
Myeongdong is one of Seoul's main shopping districts featuring mid-to-high priced retail stores and international brand outlets, including Lacoste, Polo Ralph Lauren, H&M, Zara, Forever 21, Bulgari and Louis Vuitton, as well as Korean cosmetics brands such as Nature Republic, Missha, The Face Shop and Skin Food. It is a particularly popular area for young people and tourists as a center for fashion and sight-seeing. Several large shopping centers and department stores are in the district including Lotte Department Store, Shinsegae Department Store, Migliore, M Plaza, and Noon Square.

In August 2012, as part of Lotte Department Store's expansion programme into China, a replica of the street of  Myeongdong is featured in its new store in Tianjin, with outlets of Missha, The Face Shop and Skin Food.

The floating population of Myeongdong is estimated to be around 2 million a day and in terms of floorspace rents, Myeongdong is one of the most expensive shopping districts in the world. Many hotels, restaurants, cinemas, theaters, and historical sites complete the diverse mixture of the area. In a poll of nearly 2,000 foreign visitors, conducted by the Seoul Metropolitan Government in November 2011, stated that 13.4 percent named shopping in Myeongdong as their favorite activity in Seoul.

Tourist attractions

Myeongdong Festival has been hosted since 1982 to vitalize the commercial area and encourage tourism. It is usually held twice a year: from the end of March to the middle of April in spring, and the month of September in autumn. Parades, music and dance performances, fashion shows and other spectacles are part of the festivities. Many shops and stores offer product sales and discounts during this time as well.

In 2012, the area hosted the street parade of the Cheonan World Dance Festival in October.

 China Street

Local transportation
The southern part of Myeongdong is served by Station #424, Myeong-dong on  Line 4 of the Seoul Subway, while the northern area is closer to Station #202, Euljiro 1-ga on Line 2.

Education

International schools include:
Seoul Chinese Primary School

See also
 
Myeongdong Cathedral
List of upscale shopping districts
Economy of South Korea

References

External links

Visit Korea
Myeongdong Tourist Info (English)
Life in Korea
Myeongdong Tourist Zone (Korean)
 Myeongdong resident office website

Neighbourhoods of Jung-gu, Seoul
Shopping districts and streets in South Korea
Tourist attractions in Seoul